is a train station on the Minobu Line of the Central Japan Railway Company (JR Central) in the city of Kōfu, Yamanashi Prefecture, Japan.

Lines
Kanente Station is served by the Minobu Line and is 87.2 kilometers from the southern terminus of the line at Fuji Station.

Layout
Kanente Station has one side platform serving a single bidirectional track. The station is unattended, with no station building, only a rain shelter on the platform.

Adjacent stations

History
Kanente Station was opened on August 15, 1929 as a passenger station on the Fuji-Minobu Line. Freight operations began and the system was consigned to the government on October 1, 1938. The line came under control of the Japanese Government Railways on May 1, 1941. The station burned down during the Bombing of Kofu in World War II.  The JGR became the JNR (Japan National Railway) after World War II. The station was reopened on May 10, 1953. All freight operations were discontinued on April 1, 1959. The station has been unattended since October 1, 1970. Along with the division and privatization of JNR on April 1, 1987, the station came under the control of the Central Japan Railway Company.

Surrounding area
 Kōfu Municipal Library

See also
 List of railway stations in Japan

External links

  Minobu Line station information 	

Railway stations in Japan opened in 1929
Railway stations in Yamanashi Prefecture
Minobu Line
Kōfu, Yamanashi